Qorbanabad (also Romanized as Qorbānābād; also known as Cheshmeh-ye Nargesī) is a village in Dadin Rural District, Jereh and Baladeh District, Kazerun County, Fars Province, Iran. At the 2006 census, its population was 159, in 35 families.

References 

Populated places in Kazerun County